Kin of IRRE-like protein 1, also known as NEPH1, is a protein that in humans is encoded by the KIRREL gene.

Function 

NEPH1 is a member of the NEPH protein family, which includes NEPH2 (KIRREL3, MIM 607761) and NEPH3 (KIRREL2, MIM 607762). The cytoplasmic domains of these proteins interact with the C terminus of podocin (NPHS2; MIM 604766). NEPH1 is expressed in filtration slits of kidney podocytes, cells involved in ensuring size- and charge-selective ultrafiltration of blood (Sellin et al., 2003). [supplied by OMIM]

Interactions 
KIRREL has been shown to interact with Nephrin and Tight junction protein 1.

References

Further reading